Alice Evelyn Wilson, MBE, FRSC, FRCGS (August 26, 1881 – April 15, 1964) was Canada's first female geologist. Her scientific studies of rocks and fossils in the Ottawa region between 1913 and 1963 remain a respected source of knowledge.

Early life
Wilson was born in Cobourg, Ontario in 1881 to her father Dr. John Wilson, a professor of classics at the University of Toronto. From childhood she was often exposed to nature during canoeing and camping trips with her father and two brothers. These trips sparked her interest in fossils and the study of geology. Going outdoors also assisted in improving her struggling health. During her time in college, her brothers were already critically acclaimed experts in their respective fields of geology and mathematics. So, scholarly thought and the pursuit of scientific knowledge was encouraged.

Education 
In 1901 Wilson began studying modern language and history at the Victoria College in Toronto originally intending to be a teacher. She did not finish her last year of studies due to health problems. She eventually completed her degree many years later in 1911. Despite being eligible to undertake a doctorate in 1915, Wilson was repeatedly denied paid time off from the Geological Survey of Canada (GSC), even though the GSC was granting paid absences at the time. Wilson's direct boss from 1920, Edward M. Kindle, was supportive of Alice and wanted her to take a leave and finish her doctorate though others in leadership roles at the GSC where much less so. For seven years Wilson persisted, and finally was awarded a scholarship by the Canadian Federation of University Women (CFUW) in 1926. Even then, the GSC contended Wilson's leave. After a lobbying effort from the CFUW, Wilson was granted leave, and graduated in 1929 at the age of 48 from the University of Chicago with a doctorate in geology.

Career 
In 1907 Wilson started her career at the University of Toronto museum in the mineralogy division, despite not having completed her degree. In 1909, she took an assistant job at the Victoria Memorial Museum, and then became eligible and took a temporary clerk position at the Geological Survey of Canada (GSC), which was headquartered at the Victoria Memorial Museum in Ottawa. She was later requested to translate a portion of Karl Alfred von Zittels Text-Book of Paleontology from German to English by Percy Raymond, whom also advocated Wilson to take a leave of absence from the GSC in order to finish her degree, of which she received in 1910. In 1911, she went back and was given a permanent position at the GSC. It was not until 1970 that other women were granted the same.

Before the departure of colleague Percy Raymond, she wrote two articles, both of which recorded new species of animals. Respectively, a new branchiopod and then a bivalve. Wilson faced significant difficulty being included in her colleagues' work after that.

In 1916, during the First World War, Wilson's place of work, the Victoria Memorial Museum, was shut down and reoccupied as a war-time parliament. During this time, Wilson funded her projects with her own money, studying comparative anatomy and marine biology in Long Island, New York. Later, Wilson took part in the war-time effort on the home front, joining the Canadian equivalent of the Women's Land Army. At war's end in 1920, Wilson went back to the Victoria Memorial Museum, now working as an Assistant Paleontologist. She would further be promoted to associate geologist, in 1940.

While working at the GSC, they did not allow women to work together with men during fieldwork. For fifty years she studied the area on foot, by bicycle and eventually by car. The GSC published the results of her fieldwork in 1946 and her Geology of the St. Lawrence Lowland, Ontario and Quebec was the first major geological publication about the area. In addition to a comprehensive discussion of its geology, Wilson covered the area's economic resources, including building stone, sand, gravel and drinking water. Wilson's research into the stratigraphy and invertebrate palaeontology of the Palaeozoic strata of eastern Canada was significant, though her contributions to the field did not gain recognition until after her retirement. In Ontario, her focus was on invertebrate fossils during the Ordovician period, specifically sediments and fossils in the Ottawa Valley. In the Rocky Mountains and the Arctic, Wilson studied Ordovician fauna. During the Great Depression, however, Wilson had to switch her focus from Ordovician to Devonian rocks, to meet the growing demand of petroleum in Western Canada. One of her tasks was to identify and categorize all Paleozoic invertebrates for examination. As a result, Wilson ordered the National Type Collection of fossilsan internationally recognized reference collection.

From 1948 until 1958 Wilson was a lecturer in Paleontology at Carleton College (later Carleton University). Carleton recognized Wilson both as a geologist and as an inspiring teacher with an honorary degree in 1960. Wilson also worked to bring geology to a broader public. She wrote a children's book, The Earth Beneath our Feet, aimed at encouraging broader knowledge and interest in the science she was so passionate about.

Wilson's work on researching the geology and paleontology in the area of Cornwall, Ontario and the St. Lawrence lowlands was important for the creation of the St. Lawrence Seaway that was built in 1954.

Wilson became a respected member of the GSC and mentored many young geologists through her lectures, field trips, publications, and museum exhibits. However, she was not referred to as "Doctor" by her colleagues until 194516 years after she obtained her doctorate. She retired two years later, at the age of 65, as was required by law, though five new hires were required to do the same amount of work as Wilson. However, she kept her office at the GSC and continued her work regardless of not being paid until her death in 1964.

Awards and professional recognition

Wilson was the first woman geologist hired by the Geological Survey of Canada (1909); one of the first two women elected as Fellows of The Royal Canadian Geographical Society (1930); the first Canadian woman to be admitted to the Geological Society of America (1936); and the first female Fellow of the Royal Society of Canada (1938).

In 1935, when the government of R. B. Bennett was looking to honour a woman in the federal civil service, Wilson was chosen to become a Member of the Order of the British Empire.

In 1991 the Royal Society of Canada established the Alice Wilson Awards for emerging women scholars. Wilson was inducted into the Canadian Science and Engineering Hall of Fame in 2005.

On 18 October 2018, the Government of Canada dedicated a plaque to Wilson, recognizing her as a "person of national historic significance at the Canadian Museum of Nature."

Selected publications

See also
Timeline of women in science

References

External links

 
 
 
 

1881 births
1964 deaths
Canadian women geologists
Canadian paleontologists
Geological Survey of Canada personnel
Fellows of the Royal Society of Canada
Canadian Members of the Order of the British Empire
Women paleontologists
People from Cobourg
Canadian women biologists
20th-century Canadian women scientists
Paleontology in Ontario
Persons of National Historic Significance (Canada)
20th-century Canadian biologists